Colorism in the Caribbean describes discrimination based on skin tone, or colorism, in the Caribbean.

Colorism is defined as "Prejudice or discrimination against individuals based on the shade of brown skin tone, typically among people of the same ethnic or racial group. This discrimination can be towards both light and dark shades of brown. "  The coining of the term "colorism" is commonly attributed to American Alice Walker in her 1983 book In Search of Our Mothers' Gardens: Womanist Prose.  Colorism is a global phenomenon, which affects communities of color all over the world. However, histories of slavery and colonialism have resulted in the prominence of colorism within diasporic black communities, including the Caribbean, where millions of African individuals were shipped during the Atlantic slave trade.

History 
In the mid 16th century, European explorers claimed various Caribbean islands, enslaved people in Africa, and transported them to the islands where they were forced to work on sugar plantations. The racially diverse environment of the Caribbean, due to slavery and colonization, led to "racial mixing" between Europeans and Africans. Due to the fact that many racially mixed individuals, "mulattoes," were the children of white plantation owners, they gained privileges that their darker peers did not such as: legal status, land ownership, and education. The preferential treatment mulattoes received, combined with idea of white supremacy and black inferiority promoted by colonial settlers, fostered the notion within the communities of color that lighter skin is more attractive and favorable.

Colorism across the Caribbean 
While colorism affects all Caribbean countries, it varies from country to country. Author JeffriAnne Wilder, while conducting research for her book Color Stories: Black Women and Colorism in the 21st Century, discovered that Afro-Caribbean identifying women had a tendency to qualify their statements about colorism with respect to their home country.

Haiti 
During the colonial era, the French established a "three tiered social structure" which put grand blancs (white elites) at the top and black slaves at the bottom. In between the two groups were "freedmen," the predominantly mulatto descendants of slave owners and slaves.

After the Haitian Revolution drastically altered the Haitian social structure by largely eliminating the colonial ruling class and the rest of the white population, the urban elite resided atop Haiti's social structure in the 19th century. The urban elite was an exclusive group of mulattoes. One's skin complexion determined one's individual social capital, while French norms of language, manners, religion intermarriage with other mulattoes reinforced the social hierarchy.

By the 21st century, the social hierarchy, which held lighter-complected individuals at the peak social power in the 19th century, morphed into a preference for lighter skin. Ritualistic skin bleaching to lighten one’s skin, brown paper bag tests to verify one's skin tone, and degradation of darker-complected Haitians as ugly are contemporary manifestations of colorism in Haiti.

Dominican Republic 
After declaring its independence from Spanish rule in 1821, the Dominican Republic was overtaken by Haitian rule in 1822. The Dominican Republic did not achieve independence from Haiti until after their victory in the Dominican War of Independence in 1844. However, the country fell back under Spanish rule until it reclaimed its sovereignty after the Dominican War of Restoration of 1865.

As the Dominican Republic is the only country in the Caribbean that attained its independence from Haiti, a "black country," the country and its leaders grew a disdain and disowned anything associated with Haiti. Dominican dictator, Rafael Trujillo, sought to establish a more "European" identity for the country by outlawing the practice of "African religious and cultural rites." In 1937, Trujillo ordered the massacre of 20,000 Haitians residing in the Dominican border. His successor, Joaquín Balaguer, who gained power in 1966, maintained that the Dominican Republic was a "Caucasian Western Nation," despite the predominance of black and mixed race peoples in the country’s population (84%). Dark skinned Dominicans are granted citizenship and civil rights so long as they do not identify as black. Rather in order to distinguish their "dark skin and African features,"  Dominicans use the term "Indio oscuro" (or Dark Indian).

The preference for whiteness and erasure of black identity in the Dominican Republic, pushed many Dominicans to reject their blackness for the sake of social status. Some studies suggests that lighter skin is linked to higher incomes, in the Dominican Republic. The beauty standards in the Dominican Republic also reflect the preference for proximity to whiteness, through phenotypic features (i.e. straight hair, narrow nose). Dominicans commonly refer to "African" features (i.e. kinky hair, wide nose) as "bad" or not ordinary.

Author Dixa Ramirez touches on this in her book, Colonial Phantoms: Belonging and Refusal in the Dominican Americas, from the 19th Century to the Present. Many famous Dominican leaders were often white washed when they were portrayed in statues, photographs, or paintings. Salomé Ureña was one of the most important Dominican poets of the 19th century. However, her "legacy as the face of Dominican literature and education relied on...her phenotypical whitening." In paintings immediately after Ureña's death, features that identified her blackness were erased. For instance, her skin was whitened, and her hair was straightened.This can also be said for Francisco del Rosario Sánchez, one of the founding fathers of The Dominican Republic. Sánchez, of griffe ancestry (3/4 African and 1/4 European blood), was often given a white-washed appearance in certain paintings.

Jamaica 
In 1655, English military leader, Oliver Cromwell captured Jamaica from Spain Although a few Black slaves had been brought into Jamaica while the island was under Spanish rule, after the conquest the island was fully converted into a plantation economy, contributing to 97% of the population being of total or partial African descent. Jamaican slavery was accompanied by a social hierarchy, placing whites at the top, mixed people of color with “limited privileges” next, and black slaves at the bottom. The racial hierarchy largely stemmed from sex between white men and African women. There were different names for different combinations of racial mixing. Mulatto was the offspring of a white man and black woman; the child of a mulatto and a black, a Sambo. The child of a white and a mulatto was a quadroon; the combination of quadroon and a white was a mustee. The child of a mustee by a white man was known as a musteefino. While the children of a musteefino are free by law, and rank as white persons to all intents and purposes.

The social stratification of Blacks by skin tone influences Jamaica’s social structure even after the abolition of slavery in Jamaica in 1833.  Colorism in Jamaica was perpetuated through social and cultural institutions such as music, social games, sports, and school  For example, in one particular school-yard game, Jamaican children have been heard chanting "Brown girl in the ring." According to Dr. Petra Robinson, in her dissertation, the game promotes a preference for 'brown skin girls' over dark-skinned ones. Contemporarily, many Jamaicans have used the phrase, "When your black turns brown, stick around. When you're white, it's alright."

In Jamaica, colorism is a major issue throughout the community. The majority of Jamaican women find that the lighter they are the most socially accepted they will be. Most Jamaican women believe that the color of their skin is the deciding factor of them finding a job or even a husband.

Media representation

Literary representation 
In 1926, Guyanese author and Harlem Renaissance author Eric Waldron penned the composition novel, Tropic Death. The ten stories which make up the novel explore Caribbean identity and location. Throughout the novel, namely in stories such as “the Yellow One,” and “White Snake,” Waldron represents and explores what colorism looks like in various Caribbean countries. Tropic Death is widely recognized as one of the first and most popular literary work of and on the Caribbean.

In 1953, Barbadian writer George Lamming published In the Castle of My Skin, his first acclaimed novel. The story is set in the colonial Caribbean, and explores ideologies of racism, colorism, and miseducation. Lamming stated that in his work, he aimed to capture the oppressive experience of the "terror of the mind; a daily exercise in self-mutilation. Black versus black in a battle for self-improvement.

Multimedia representation

Television 
On Télévision Nationale d'Haïti (TNH or the Haitian National Television Network), cultural color stereotypes like “Zuzu girl” on the pop-culture comedy show Regards Croisés and other fictional representatives of the Haitian elite and other recognizable stereotypes have been featured.

Music 
In Jamaica, Reggae music has often been used to protests against skin whitening and colorism in Jamaica. Many reggae artists have been strong proponents of the Black is Beautiful campaign which started in the 1970s.

Popular Jamaican dancehall artist, Vybz Kartel, fielded accusations of skin whitening in 2011, when people noticed his lighten complexion. In response to the allegations, Kartel stated "When black women stop straightening their hair and wearing wigs and weaves... then I’ll stop using the ‘cakesoap’ and we’ll all live naturally ever after." Following these comments, Kartel announced the launching of his own cosmetic line which featured skin bleaching products.

Social media

The social media campaign, #UnfairandLovely, aims to combat global colorism by "highlight[ing] the beauty of dark-skinned people of color, who are routinely under-represented in the media around the world." The campaign satirizes the name of the skin whitening cream, "Fair and Lovely."

Skin bleaching 
Skin Bleaching is the process of using cosmetic, homemade or dermatological concoctions for the purpose of lightening one’s skin. Skin bleaching has global commercial appeal as seen by the sale of products such as: “Skin So White,” “White Perfect,” and “White and Lovely.” These products are mostly sold outside the US, in places like the Caribbean, African countries, India, and others. Many scholars theorize that the phenomenon known as, Skin bleaching, is a product of the preference for lighter skin in communities of color. Some studies show that because, since slavery lighter skin has been treated more favorably than dark skin in colonized communities, people of color have been motivated to bleach their skin.

Skin bleaching, according to some medical research, causes fragile skin, bad scarring, poor wound healing and possibly cancer. For this reason, countries in which bleaching is popular have attempted various means to cease the use of bleaching creams and other products. Jamaica, banned several bleaching creams, dolled out fines for their usage, and ran a campaign "Don't Kill the Skin," where police raided various vendors of bleaching products. However, as skin bleaching products are easily homemade, bleaching prevailed the government's attempts.

The skin bleaching epidemic is growing like wildfire especially in Jamaica. Those who bleach often are called, "Bleachers." It occurs so much because, darker Jamaican women want to feel "beautiful," and wanted; not only by a significant other but by the workforce.[21] There is a documentary called, "Skin Bleaching in Jamaica June 2013," in this video journalist went around Jamaica interviewing different women, asking them why they bleached and about who its harming their bodies. One lady said, "When you're black nobody sees you, when you're brown then they will see you."

Noted works 
 Shades of Difference: Why Skin Color Matters by Evelyn Green
 The Construction and Representation of Race and Ethnicity in the Caribbean and the World by Mervyn C. Alleyne
Colorism in the Spanish Caribbean: Legacies of Race and Racism in Dominican and Puerto Rican Literature by Malinda M. Williams
Black in Latin America by Henry Louis Gates, Jr.
Representations of Colorism in the Jamaican Culture and the Practice of Skin Bleaching by Christopher Andrew Dwight Charles
Colorism and Class in the Jamaican Literary Imagination by Brittani Nivens
Race, Gender, and the Politics of Skin Tone by Margaret L. Hunter
Film and Fabrication: How Hollywood Determines how We SEE Colorism: A Cultural Reading by Nawshaba Ahmed
Skin Deep: Women Writing on Color, Culture and Identity by Elena Featherston
Cues of Colorism: The Psychological, Sociocultural, and Developmental Differences Between Light-skinned and Dark-skinned African-Americans by Tasia M. Pinkston
The Borders of Dominicanidad: Race, Nation, and Archives of Contradiction by Lorgia Garcia-Peña

References

Discrimination based on skin color
Discrimination in North America
Politics of the Caribbean